Times is a 2021 South Korean television series starring Lee Seo-jin, Lee Joo-young, Kim Yeong-cheol and Moon Jeong-hee. It aired on OCN from February 20 to March 28, 2021.

Synopsis
Lee Jin-woo (Lee Seo-jin) and Seo Jung-in (Lee Joo-young) are both reporters, though the former lives in 2015 and the latter in 2020. One day, they discover that they can contact each other through a phone call. They start working together in order to prevent the murder of Jung-in's father Seo Gi-tae (Kim Yeong-cheol), the President of South Korea.

Cast

Main
 Lee Seo-jin as Lee Jin-woo
 Lee Joo-young as Seo Jung-in
 Kim Yeong-cheol as Seo Gi-tae
 Moon Jeong-hee as Kim Young-joo

Supporting
 Kim In-kwon as Do Young-jae
 Moon Ji-in as Myung Soo-kyung
 Jung Sung-il as Kang Sin-wook
 Ha Jun as Lee Geun-woo
 Yu Sung-ju as Nam Sung-bum
 Shim Hyung-tak as Han Do-kyung
 Heo Jae-ho as Yoon Sung-ho
 Bae Hyun-kyung as Oh Jung-sik
 Song Young-chang as Baek Gyu-min
 Park Ye-ni as Song Min-joo
 Lim Soo-hyun as Jung Yu-mi

Production
Lee Seo-jin and Kim Yeong-cheol previously starred in Wonderful Days (2014).

Original soundtrack

Part 1

Part 2

Part 3

Viewership

Awards and nominations

Notes

References

External links
  
 
 
 

OCN television dramas
Korean-language television shows
2021 South Korean television series debuts
South Korean crime television series
South Korean science fiction television series
Television series about multiple time paths
Television series by Studio Dragon
Television series by Story Hunter Production